Elizabeth Butler may refer to:

Elizabeth Thompson (1846–1933), British painter who married Lieutenant General Sir William Butler
Elizabeth Beardsley Butler (1885–1911), social investigator of the Progressive Era
Elizabeth Golcher Butler (1831–1906), Most Worthy Grand Matron of the Order of the Eastern Star
Elizabeth Butler, Countess of Desmond (c. 1585–1625) Countess of Desmond and Lady Dingwall
Elizabeth Butler, Countess of Ormond (1332–1390), wife of Irish peer James Butler, 2nd Earl of Ormond
Elizabeth Butler, Duchess of Ormond (1615–1684)
Eliza Marian Butler (1885–1959), English scholar of German
Elizabeth Butler-Sloss, Baroness Butler-Sloss (born 1933), English judge
Elizabeth Stanhope, Countess of Chesterfield (1640–1665), née Butler
Betsy Butler (born 1963), American politician

See also
Betty Butler (disambiguation)